is a Quasi-National Park in northeast Nara Prefecture, Japan.  Established in 1970, the park consists of one continuous area spanning the borders of the municipalities of Nara, Tenri, and Sakurai. The park encompasses Mount Miwa, Enshō-ji, Isonokami Jingū, Chōgaku-ji, Ōmiwa Jinja, and Hase-dera, as well as a number of kofun.

See also

 List of national parks of Japan

References

External links
  Map of the parks of Nara Prefecture

National parks of Japan
Parks and gardens in Nara Prefecture
Protected areas established in 1970